Berhautia is a genus of flowering plants belonging to the family Loranthaceae.

Its native range is Western Tropical Africa.

Species:

Berhautia senegalensis

References

Loranthaceae
Loranthaceae genera